Samuel "Sonny" Henderson (born 25 November 1944 in Garngad, Glasgow) is a Scottish former footballer who played for Celtic, Stirling Albion and Clydebank in the Scottish Football League. After retiring as a player he became a coach at Clydebank and was later their manager. As manager, Henderson helped Clydebank win promotion to the Scottish Premier Division in 1985.

References

External links
 Sammy Henderson at Celtic at fitbastats.com
 
 
 

1944 births
Living people
Scottish footballers
Association football wing halves
Footballers from Glasgow
Ashfield F.C. players
Celtic F.C. players
Stirling Albion F.C. players
Clydebank F.C. (1965) players
Scottish Football League players
Scottish football managers
Clydebank F.C. (1965) managers
Scottish Football League managers
Scottish Junior Football Association players
Clydebank F.C. (1965) non-playing staff